A referendum on retaining the republic was held in Greece on 8 December 1974. After the collapse of the military junta that ruled the country since 1967, the issue of the form of government remained unsolved. The Junta had already staged a referendum held on 29 July 1973, which resulted in the establishment of the Republic. However, after the fall of the military regime, the new government, under Prime Minister Constantine Karamanlis, decided to hold another one, as Junta constituent acts were considered void. Constantine II, the former king, was banned by the new government from returning to Greece to campaign in the referendum, but the Karamanlis government allowed him to make a televised address to the nation. A total of 69.2% of voters favoured retaining the republic with a turnout of 75.6%.

Campaign
The referendum campaign included television debates in which Constantine himself took part on the monarchist side, and those debating in favour of the republic included Marios Ploritis, Leonidas Kyrkos, Phaedon Vegleris, George Koumandos, Alexandros Panagoulis and Costas Simitis, who later (from 1996 to 2004) served as Prime Minister of Greece.

Political parties abstained from taking part in the referendum campaign, with the television debates confined to ordinary citizens representing one side or the other (although most members of some parties and alliances had sympathies for one side or the other, with members of the National Democratic Union in favour of restoring the monarchy and the United Left, Centre Union – New Forces, and PASOK in favour of the republic). On 23 November 1974 Prime Minister Karamanlis requested for his parliamentary party group (New Democracy) to adopt a neutral stance on the issue. Two televised speeches a week were given to each side, with an additional two messages broadcast by the former king; a radio broadcast on 26 November and a television speech on 6 December.

Results by region

By region
The electorate voted categorically in favour of republic. Crete gave more than 90% of its vote for the republic, but in around thirty constituencies, the result for republic was around 60–70%. The largest wins for the restoration of the monarchy were in the Peloponnese and Thrace, at around 45%. The constituencies with the highest votes for the restoration were Laconia at 59.52%, Rhodope at 50.54%, Messenia with 49.24%, Elis at 46.88% and Argos at 46.67%.

Aftermath

With the announcement of the results, Karamanlis said: "A cancer has been removed from the body of the nation today." On 15 December 1974, the incumbent junta President Phaedon Gizikis submitted his resignation, and Karamanlis thanked him with a personal visit and by writing for his services to the country. On 18 December 1974, Michail Stasinopoulos, a state list MP for New Democracy, was elected and sworn in as President of Greece.

In February 1988, Prime Minister Constantine Mitsotakis stated in an interview given in London that although he was a republican, the manner in which the referendum was carried out had been "unfair". The statement attracted wide criticism in Greece and was debated in the media.  For the remainder of his life, under the pretense of invoking the narrative style reserved for historical reminiscence, Mitsotakis continued to refer to the deposed monarch deferentially by referring to him as the "King" in multiple interviews.

In April 2007, the newspaper To Vima carried out a survey in which only 11.6% of those polled wished for Greece to become a monarchy again.

References

1974 referendums
Republic
Republicanism in Greece
1974 in Greece
1970s in Greek politics
Monarchism in Greece
Constitutional referendums
Monarchy referendums
December 1974 events in Europe
Constantine II of Greece